is a national highway connecting the Port of Kobe and National Route 2 in Kobe, Japan. It is the shortest national highway in Japan.

Route description

National Route 174 measures just  from its southern terminus at the Port of Kobe to its northern terminus, a junction with National Route 2 in Chūō-ku, Kobe. This brief routing makes it the shortest out of all of Japan's national highways.

History
On 18 May 1953, the road was established by the Cabinet of Japan as Second Class National Highway 174  between the Port of Kobe to its intersection with National Route 2. That route was upgraded on 1 April 1965 to the current General National Highway 174.

Junction list
The entire highway is in Hyōgo Prefecture.

References

174
Roads in Hyōgo Prefecture